Carlos Villagra (born 22 August 1976) is a Paraguayan football forward.

Club career
Villagra previously played for Libertad, Cerro Porteño, Sportivo Luqueño, and 12 de Octubre in Paraguay. He has usually spent his time in Colombia with Deportivo Pasto, Millonarios, Atlético Nacional, Atlético Huila, and Deportes Quindío in his 30s.

He has also played for CSD Municipal of Peru LDU Quito of Ecuador, as well as Oriente Petrolero of Bolivia.

Honors

References

External links
   Carlos Villagra primer refuerzo del Atletico Huila
 Eurosport - Villagra Joins Atletico Nacional
  
 Profile at GolGolGol.net

1976 births
Living people
Sportspeople from Asunción
Paraguayan footballers
Paraguayan expatriate footballers
Club Libertad footballers
Cerro Porteño players
Sportivo Luqueño players
Club Nacional footballers
Paraguayan expatriate sportspeople in Bolivia
C.S.D. Municipal players
Expatriate footballers in Guatemala
L.D.U. Quito footballers
Expatriate footballers in Ecuador
Oriente Petrolero players
Expatriate footballers in Bolivia
Millonarios F.C. players
Paraguayan expatriate sportspeople in Colombia
Atlético Nacional footballers
Expatriate footballers in Colombia
Paraguayan expatriate sportspeople in Chile
Coquimbo Unido footballers
Expatriate footballers in Chile
Association football forwards